Nissim Kanekar (born 11 September 1973) is an Indian astrophysicist, cosmologist and a professor at National Centre for Radio Astrophysics of Tata Institute of Fundamental Research. Known for his research on the evolution of the electron proton mass ratio, Kanekar is a member of the International Astronomical Union and a recipient of Swarna Jayathi Fellowship of the Department of Science and Technology. The Council of Scientific and Industrial Research, the apex agency of the Government of India for scientific research, awarded him the Shanti Swarup Bhatnagar Prize for Science and Technology, one of the highest Indian science awards, for his contributions to physical sciences in 2017.

Biography 

Nissim Kanekar, born on 11 September 1973 in Mumbai in the western Indian state of Maharashtra, did his undergraduate studies at Ramnarain Ruia College of Mumbai University and, after earning a graduate degree (BSc) in physics in 1991, moved to Savitribai Phule Pune University for his master's studies to obtain an MSc in 1995. He enrolled for his doctoral studies at the same institution and carrying out his research at National Centre for Radio Astrophysics, a research institute managed by Tata Institute of Fundamental Research, he secured a PhD in 2000. His post-doctoral work was at NCRA during 2000–01, at Kapteyn Institute of University of Groningen during 2002–04 under a NOVA fellowship and at the Socorro center of the National Radio Astronomy Observatory during 2004–08 holding Jansky and Max-Planck fellowships. In 2009, he joined NCRA as a reader in 2009 and has served as an associate professor since 2012.

Legacy and honours 

One of the principal contributions of Kanekar was the establishment of observational bounds for the study of the evolution of the electron proton mass ratio. He has also done reportedly notable work on the fine structure constant over cosmological time scales. He was one among the group of astronomers who observed a pair of distant Milky Way-like galaxies in early 2017 which has since been detailed in a paper published by the scientists. His studies have been documented by way of a number of articles and ResearchGate, an online article repository of scientific articles, has listed 115 of them. He has also delivered several lectures on astronomy which include a series of lectures delivered at Indian Institute of Science Education and Research, Mohali in 2014.

Kanekar received the URSI Young Scientist Award of the International Union of Radio Science in 2005 which he declined. Three years later, the Astronomical Society of India chose him, along with Niayesh Afshordi, for the 2008 Vainu Bappu Gold Medal and he became a Ramanujan Fellow of the Department of Science and Technology in 2009, the tenure of the fellowship running until 2014. In 2015, he shared the bi-annual Hari Om Prerit Vikram Sarabhai Award of the Physical Research Laboratory with Dibyendu Chakraborty; the same year, he was selected for the Swarna Jayanthi fellowship of the Department of Science and Technology. He has held various research fellowships, including Max Planck Fellowship (2007–09), Jansky Fellowship (2004–08), and NOVA Fellowship (2002–04) and he declined the Bolton Fellowship twice and ASTRON Fellowship once. The Council of Scientific and Industrial Research awarded Kanekar the Shanti Swarup Bhatnagar Prize, one of the highest Indian science awards in 2017. The lectureships held by him include the Delta Lecturership Award (2014) of the National Central University, Distinguished Visitorship (2005–06) of Australia Telescope National Facility and ESO Visiting Fellowship (2005) of the European Southern Observatory. He is also a member of the International Astronomical Union.

Selected bibliography

See also

Notes

References

Further reading

External links 
 
 
 

Recipients of the Shanti Swarup Bhatnagar Award in Physical Science
21st-century Indian physicists
Indian scientific authors
1973 births
Living people
Indian astrophysicists
Indian cosmologists
University of Mumbai alumni
Savitribai Phule Pune University alumni
Academic staff of Tata Institute of Fundamental Research
Scientists from Mumbai